Darkhvor-e Aqa Reza (also Romanized as Dārkhvor-e Āqā Reẕā; also known as Dārkhor-e Āqā Reẕā) is a village in Haft Ashiyan Rural District, Kuzaran District, Kermanshah County, Kermanshah Province, Iran. At the 2006 census, its population was 97, in 22 families.

References 

Populated places in Kermanshah County